The 1953 Michigan Wolverines baseball team represented the University of Michigan in the 1953 NCAA baseball season. The Wolverines played their home games at Ferry Field. The team was coached by Ray Fisher in his 33rd season at Michigan.

The Wolverines won the 1953 College World Series, defeating the Texas Longhorns in the championship game.

Roster

Back row: Daniel Cline, Don Eaddy, Marvin Wisnewski, Ray Pavichevich, Paul Lepley
Middle row: Jack Ritter, Richard Leach, Garabed Tadian, Paul Fancher, Robert Woschitz, Jack Corbett, Richard Yirkosky, Robert Margolin (manager)
Front row: Bruce Haynam, Frank Howell, Ray Fisher (coach), Bill Mogk (captain), Gerald Harrington, Gil Sabuco, Bill Billings

Schedule

Awards and honors 
Don Eaddy
All-Big Ten First Team

Bruce Haynam
All-America First Team 
All-Big Ten First Team

Paul Lepley
All-American Third Team

References

Michigan
Michigan Wolverines baseball seasons
College World Series seasons
NCAA Division I Baseball Championship seasons
Big Ten Conference baseball champion seasons
Michigan Wolverines baseball